KZID (98.5 FM) is a radio station. It is licensed to Culdesac, Idaho. The station serves the Lewiston-Clarkston and Moscow-Pullman areas. The station is currently owned by James and Darcy Nelly, through licensee Nelly Broadcasting LLC.

Branded as KHITS-FM, the station serves the Lewiston, Clarkston, Asotin, Orofino, Moscow-Pullman and surrounding areas and plays hits from the 1970s, 1980s and 1990s. It is the home of Clarkston Bantam Sports Radio Network and covers Clarkston High School Football and Boys and Girls Basketball.   KHITS-FM focuses on local events marketing and community involvement.

References

External links

ZID